Horace Henry Stevens (20 October 1912 – 14 January 1940) was an  Australian rules footballer who played with North Melbourne in the Victorian Football League (VFL). He drowned in the Yarra River at the age of 27.

Notes

External links 

1912 births
1940 deaths
Australian rules footballers from Victoria (Australia)
North Melbourne Football Club players
Deaths by drowning in Australia
Accidental deaths in Victoria (Australia)